State Highway 30 (SH 30)  runs from Business SH 6-R in College Station via Roans Prairie to SH 19 in Huntsville. It is known as Harvey Road between Business SH 6-R and FM 158 in College Station, as 11th Street between I-45 and US 190 (Phelps Dr) in Huntsville, and as Riverside Drive east of US 190 (Phelps Dr) in Huntsville.

The current version of SH 30, the second route with that designation, was established in 1960. The previous designation existed from 1917 to 1939, when it was replaced with US 277.

History

Previous routes
 SH 30 was a route proposed on October 8, 1917 to run from Wichita Falls to Abilene. On December 18, 1917, an intercounty highway from Abilene to Paint Rock was designated. On August 19, 1918, the intercounty highway became part of SH 30. On April 23, 1919, the road extended to Sabinal. On August 21, 1923, the southern portion was rerouted into Del Rio on August 21, 1923 over part of SH 7A and SH 4. The old route became part of rerouted SH 23, with the section south of Menard cancelled. That same day, SH 30 extended to the Oklahoma border, replacing a portion of SH 2. On March 17, 1924, SH 30 extended to the Mexico border. On September 26, 1939, the highway was cancelled as U.S. Highway 277 was routed over its entirety from Del Rio to Wichita Falls.

Current route
The current iteration of SH 30 was designated on December 15, 1960, replacing SH 45 and parts of FM 60 and FM 158 to avoid confusion with I-45. On May 21, 1979, SH 30 was extended from I-45 to SH 19, replacing part of SH 19, which was rerouted over former Loop 405.

Major junctions

References

030
Transportation in Brazos County, Texas
Transportation in Grimes County, Texas
Transportation in Walker County, Texas